The chancellor of the Exchequer, often abbreviated to chancellor, is a senior minister of the Crown within the Government of the United Kingdom, and head of His Majesty's Treasury. As one of the four Great Offices of State, the Chancellor is a high-ranking member of the British Cabinet.

Responsible for all economic and financial matters, the role is equivalent to that of a finance minister in other countries. The chancellor is now always Second Lord of the Treasury as one of at least six lords commissioners of the Treasury, responsible for executing the office of the Treasurer of the Exchequer the others are the prime minister and Commons government whips. In the 18th and early 19th centuries, it was common for the prime minister also to serve as Chancellor of the Exchequer if he sat in the Commons; the last Chancellor who was simultaneously prime minister and Chancellor of the Exchequer was Stanley Baldwin in 1923. Formerly, in cases when the chancellorship was vacant, the Lord Chief Justice of the King's Bench would act as chancellor pro tempore. The last Lord Chief Justice to serve in this way was Lord Denman in 1834.

The chancellor is the third-oldest major state office in English and British history, and in recent times has come to be the most powerful office in British politics after the prime minister. They originally carried responsibility for the Exchequer, the medieval English institution for the collection and auditing of royal revenues. The earliest surviving records which are the results of the exchequer's audit, date from 1129 to 1130 under King Henry I and show continuity from previous years. The Chancellor has oversight of fiscal policy, therefore of taxation and public spending across government departments. It previously controlled monetary policy as well until 1997, when the Bank of England was granted independent control of its interest rates.

Since 1718, all chancellors of the exchequer, except at times the lord chief justice as interim holders, have been members of the House of Commons with Lord Stanhope being the last chancellor from the House of Lords.

The office holder works alongside the other Treasury ministers and the permanent secretary to the Treasury. The corresponding shadow minister is the shadow chancellor of the Exchequer, and the chancellor is also scrutinised by the Liberal Democrat Treasury spokesperson and the Treasury Select Committee.

Jeremy Hunt has been the incumbent chancellor since 14 October 2022.

Second Lord of the Treasury 
The holder of the office of Chancellor of the Exchequer is ex officio Second Lord of the Treasury as a member of the commission exercising the ancient office of Treasurer of the Exchequer. As Second Lord, his official residence is 11 Downing Street in London, next door to the residence of the first lord of the Treasury (a title that has for many years been held by the prime minister), who resides in 10 Downing Street. While in the past both houses were private residences, today they serve as interlinked offices, with the occupant living in an apartment made from attic rooms previously resided in by servants.

Since 1827, the chancellor has almost always held the office of Second Lord of the Treasury when that person has not also been the prime minister. A notable recent exception is Kwasi Kwarteng, whom Charles III appointed Second Lord on 18 October 2022, four days after Kwarteng had resigned the chancellorship.

Roles and responsibilities
A previous chancellor, Robert Lowe, described the office in the following terms in the House of Commons, on 11 April 1870: "The Chancellor of the Exchequer is a man whose duties make him more or less of a taxing machine. He is entrusted with a certain amount of misery which it is his duty to distribute as fairly as he can."

Fiscal policy
The chancellor has considerable control over other departments as it is the Treasury that sets Departmental Expenditure Limits. The amount of power this gives to an individual chancellor depends on their personal forcefulness, their status within their party and their relationship with the prime minister. Gordon Brown, who became chancellor when Labour came into Government in 1997, had a large personal power base in the party. Perhaps as a result, Tony Blair chose to keep him in the same position throughout his ten years as prime minister; making Brown an unusually dominant figure and the longest-serving chancellor since the Reform Act of 1832. This has strengthened a pre-existing trend towards the chancellor occupying a clear second position among government ministers, elevated above his traditional peers, the foreign secretary and home secretary.

One part of the chancellor's key roles involves the framing of the annual year budget. As of 2017, the first is the Autumn Budget, also known as Budget Day which forecasts government spending in the next financial year and also announces new financial measures. The second is a Spring Statement, also known as a "mini-Budget". Britain's tax year has retained the old Julian end of year: 24 March (Old Style) / 5 April (New Style, i.e. Gregorian). From 1993, the Budget was in spring, preceded by an annual autumn statement. This was then called Pre-Budget Report. The Autumn Statement usually took place in November or December. The 1997, 2001, 2002, 2003, 2006, 2007, 2008, 2012 and 2016 budgets were all delivered on a Wednesday, summarised in a speech to the House of Commons.

The budget is a state secret until the chancellor reveals it in his speech to Parliament. Hugh Dalton, on his way to giving the budget speech in 1947, inadvertently blurted out key details to a newspaper reporter, and they appeared in print before he made his speech. Dalton was forced to resign.

Monetary policy
Although the Bank of England is responsible for setting interest rates, the chancellor also plays an important part in the monetary policy structure. He sets the inflation target which the Bank must set interest rates to meet. Under the Bank of England Act 1998 the chancellor has the power of appointment of four out of nine members of the Bank's Monetary Policy Committee – the so-called 'external' members. He also has a high level of influence over the appointment of the Bank's Governor and Deputy Governors, and has the right of consultation over the appointment of the two remaining MPC members from within the Bank. The Act also provides that the Government has the power to give instructions to the Bank on interest rates for a limited period in extreme circumstances. This power has never been officially used.

Ministerial arrangements
At HM Treasury the chancellor is supported by a political team of four junior ministers and by permanent civil servants. The most important junior minister is the chief secretary to the Treasury, a member of the Cabinet, to whom the negotiations with other government departments on the details of government spending are delegated, followed by the paymaster general, the financial secretary to the Treasury and the economic secretary to the Treasury. Whilst not continuously in use, there can also be appointed a commercial secretary to the Treasury and an exchequer secretary to the Treasury. Two other officials are given the title of a secretary to the Treasury, although neither is a government minister in the Treasury: the parliamentary secretary to the Treasury is the Government Chief Whip in the House of Commons; the permanent secretary to the Treasury is not a minister but the senior civil servant in the Treasury.

The chancellor is obliged to be a member of the Privy Council, and thus is styled the Right Honourable (Rt. Hon.). Because the House of Lords is excluded from financial matters by tradition confirmed by the Parliament Acts, the office is effectively limited to members of the House of Commons; apart from the occasions when the lord chief justice of the King's Bench has acted as interim Chancellor. The last peer to hold the office was Henry Booth, 2nd Baron Delamer (created Earl of Warrington shortly after leaving office) from 9 April 1689 to 18 March 1690. The chancellor holds the formerly independent office of Master of the Mint as a subsidiary office.

Perquisites of the office

Official residence
The chancellor of the Exchequer has no official London residence as such but since 1828 in his role as Second Lord of the Treasury he lives in the second lord's official residence, No. 11 Downing Street. In 1997, the then first and second Lords, Tony Blair and Gordon Brown respectively, swapped apartments, as the Chancellor's apartment in No. 11 was bigger and thus better suited to the needs of Blair (who had children living with him, including one born during his tenure) than Brown who was at that stage unmarried.

Dorneywood

Dorneywood is the summer residence that is traditionally made available to the chancellor, though it is the prime minister who ultimately decides who may use it. It reverted to the chancellor in 2007, then Alistair Darling.

Budget box

The chancellor traditionally carries his budget speech to the House of Commons in a particular red despatch Box.  The chancellor's red briefcase is identical to the briefcases used by all other government ministers (known as ministerial boxes or "despatch boxes") to transport their official papers but is better known because the chancellor traditionally displays the briefcase, containing the budget speech, to the press in the morning before delivering the speech.

The original budget briefcase was first used by William Ewart Gladstone in 1853 and continued in use until 1965 when James Callaghan was the first chancellor to break with tradition when he used a newer box. Prior to Gladstone, a generic red despatch box of varying design and specification was used. The practice is said to have begun in the late 16th century, when Queen Elizabeth I's representative Francis Throckmorton presented the Spanish Ambassador, Bernardino de Mendoza, with a specially constructed red briefcase filled with black puddings.

In July 1997, Gordon Brown became the second chancellor to use a new box for the Budget. Made by industrial trainees at Babcock Rosyth Defence Ltd ship and submarine dockyard in Fife, the new box is made of yellow pine, with a brass handle and lock, covered in scarlet leather and embossed with the Royal cypher and crest and the Chancellor's title. In his first Budget, in March 2008, Alistair Darling reverted to using the original budget briefcase and his successor, George Osborne, continued this tradition for his first budget, before announcing that it would be retired due to its fragile condition. The key to the original budget box has been lost.

Budget tipple
By tradition, the chancellor has been allowed to drink whatever they wish while making the annual budget speech to Parliament. This includes alcohol, which is otherwise banned under parliamentary rules.

Previous chancellors have opted for whisky (Kenneth Clarke), gin and tonic (Geoffrey Howe), brandy and water (Benjamin Disraeli and John Major), spritzer (Nigel Lawson) and sherry and beaten egg (William Gladstone).

The recent chancellors, Philip Hammond, George Osborne, Alistair Darling and Gordon Brown, opted for water. In fact Darling drank what was named "Standard Water" in reference to, and support of, the London Evening Standard newspaper's campaign to have plain tap water available in restaurants at no charge to customers.

Robe of office
The chancellor, as Master of the Mint, has a robe of office, similar to that of the lord chancellor (as seen in several of the portraits depicted below). In recent times, it has only regularly been worn at coronations, but some chancellors (at least until the 1990s) have also worn it when attending the Trial of the Pyx as Master of the Mint. According to George Osborne, the robe (dating from Gladstone's time in office, and worn by the likes of Lloyd George and Churchill) 'went missing' during Gordon Brown's time as chancellor.

List of chancellors of the Exchequer

Chancellors of the Exchequer of England ( – ) 

  Died in office.

Chancellors of the Exchequer of England ( – 1708)

Chancellors of the Exchequer of Great Britain (1708–1817)

Chancellors of the Exchequer of the United Kingdom (1817–present) 
Although the Kingdoms of Great Britain and Ireland had been united by the Acts of Union 1800 (39 & 40 Geo. III c. 67), the Exchequers of the two Kingdoms were not consolidated until 1817 under 56 Geo. III c. 98. For the holders of the Irish office before this date, see Chancellor of the Exchequer of Ireland.

Timeline

1945–present

See also

 Shadow Chancellor of the Exchequer
 List of Lord High Treasurers of England and Great Britain

Notes

References

Further reading
 Barber, Stephen. "'Westminster's wingman'? Shadow chancellor as a strategic and coveted political role." British Politics 11.2 (2016): 184–204.
 Baxter, Stephen B. The Development of the Treasury, 1660–1702 (1957) online 
 Browning, Peter. The Treasury and Economic Policy: 1964–1985 (Longman, 1986).
 Dell, Edmund. The Chancellors: A History of the Chancellors of the Exchequer, 1945–90 (HarperCollins, 1997) 619pp;  17 chapters covering the terms of each chancellor.
 Holt, Richard. Second Amongst Equals: Chancellors of the Exchequer and the British Economy (Profile Books, 2001).
 Jenkins, Roy. The Chancellors (1998); 497pp; covers entire career as well as term in office of 19 chancellors from 1886 to 1947.
 Kynaston, David. The chancellor of the exchequer (T. Dalton, 1980).
 Peden, G. C. The Treasury and British Public Policy, 1906–1959 (Oxford UP, 2000). online
 Seldon, Anthony. The Impossible Office? The History of the British Prime Minister (2021) excerpt major scholarly history. Covers the relations with Prime Minister in Chapter 9.
 Vincent, Nicholas C. "The Origins of the Chancellorship of the Exchequer." English Historical Review 108.426 (1993): 105–121. in JSTOR
 Woodward, Nicholas. The management of the British economy, 1945–2001 (Manchester University Press, 2004).

External links 

 

Ceremonial officers in the United Kingdom
Chancellors of the Exchequer
Exchequer offices
United Kingdom
Lists of government ministers of the United Kingdom
Ministerial offices in the United Kingdom